United Nations Security Council Resolution 1926, adopted unanimously on June 2, 2010, after noting the resignation of International Court of Justice (ICJ) judge Thomas Buergenthal with effect from September 6, 2010. The Council decided that the election to fill the vacancy would take place on September 9, 2010 at a meeting of the Security Council and at a meeting of the General Assembly.

The vacancy had to be filled in accordance with the Statute of the ICJ. Buergenthal had served at the ICJ since March 2000. He was re-elected in 2006 to serve a nine-year term beginning in February 2006.

See also 
 Judges of the International Court of Justice
 List of United Nations Security Council Resolutions 1901 to 2000 (2009–2011)

References

External links 
 
Text of the Resolution at undocs.org

 1926
 1926
June 2010 events